Fishtrap Lake is a  reservoir in Pike County, Kentucky. Dedicated by President Lyndon B. Johnson in 1968, the lake was formed by the impounding of the Levisa Fork of the Big Sandy River at the 195-foot-high Fishtrap Dam by the United States Army Corps of Engineers.

It is the primary attraction of Fishtrap Lake State Park.

References

External links
 Fishtrap Lake - U.S. Army Corps of Engineers
 
 Fishtrap Lake facilities map

Infrastructure completed in 1968
Reservoirs in Kentucky
United States Army Corps of Engineers dams
Protected areas of Pike County, Kentucky
Bodies of water of Pike County, Kentucky
1968 establishments in Kentucky